1st Aurel Awards

Producer Forza 

Broadcaster Markíza 

Lifetime Achievement Jaroslav Filip

2nd ►

The 1st Aurel Awards, honoring the best in the Slovak music industry for individual achievements for the year of 2001, took time and place on March 2, 2002 at the Istropolis in Bratislava.

Winners

Main categories

Others

References

External links
 Academy of Popular Music (APH) > Members (at IFPI.sk)
 Aurel Awards > 2001 Nominees (at IFPI.sk)
 Aurel Awards > 2001 Winners (at IFPI.sk)

1
Aurel Awards
2002 music awards